Zadran District is a district of Paktia Province, Afghanistan. The district is within the heartland of the Zadran tribe of Pashtuns. The soccer player Djelaludin Sharityar was born in Zadran. The estimated population is 27,007 (2019).

References

Districts of Paktia Province